Otgonbaataryn Uuganbaatar (born 19 February 1988) is a Mongolian judoka. He competed at the 2016 Summer Olympics in the men's 81 kg event, in which he was eliminated in the second round by Mohamed Abdelaal.

References

External links
 
 

1988 births
Living people
Sportspeople from Ulaanbaatar
Mongolian male judoka
Olympic judoka of Mongolia
Judoka at the 2016 Summer Olympics
Judoka at the 2010 Asian Games
Judoka at the 2018 Asian Games
Asian Games bronze medalists for Mongolia
Asian Games medalists in judo
Medalists at the 2018 Asian Games
20th-century Mongolian people
21st-century Mongolian people